Dacampia is a genus of fungi in the family Dacampiaceae. It contains 15 species. The genus was circumscribed in 1853 by Italian lichenologist Abramo Bartolommeo Massalongo, with Dacampia hookeri assigned as the type species. The genus name honours Italian naturalist Benedetto de Dacampo (1787–1851).

Species
 Dacampia caloplacicola 
 Dacampia cladoniicola 
 Dacampia cyrtellae 
 Dacampia hookeri 
 Dacampia lecaniae 
 Dacampia leptogiicola 
 Dacampia muralicola 
 Dacampia neglecta 
 Dacampia peltigericola 
 Dacampia pentaseptata 
 Dacampia rhizocarpicola 
 Dacampia rubra 
 Dacampia rufescentis 
 Dacampia xanthomendozae

References

Pleosporales
Dothideomycetes genera
Taxa named by Abramo Bartolommeo Massalongo
Taxa described in 1853